William J. Hayhoe II (born September 6, 1946) is a former American football offensive tackle in the National Football League (NFL) who played for the Green Bay Packers. Hayhoe played collegiate ball for Los Angeles Valley College and the University of Southern California before being drafted by the Green Bay Packers in the 5th round of the 1969 NFL Draft.  He played professionally for 5 seasons and retired in 1973.

In 1967, he played a key role in beating UCLA and helping his team win an eventual National championship, when he blocked 2 field goals and affected the efficiency of placekicker Zenon Andrusyshyn (he also missed a field goal and a critical extra point). Then USC head coach John McKay, remarked that "Andrusyshyn kicks with low leverage,".

References

1946 births
Living people
Players of American football from Los Angeles
American football offensive tackles
Los Angeles Valley Monarchs football players
USC Trojans football players
Green Bay Packers players